Jiv or JIV may refer to:

 JIV, abbreviation for Journal of Interpersonal Violence, 
 jiv, the ISO 639-3 code for the Shuar language
 jīv, the Sanskrit verb-root giving rise to Jiva, a living being, in Hinduism and Jainism